Palcaraju (from Quechua pallqa, p'allqa, p'alqa forked, branched, fork, rahu snow, ice, mountain with snow,) is a mountain in the Cordillera Blanca mountain range in the region of Ancash within the Peruvian Andes.

Palcaraju has three peaks: Palcaraju, Palcaraju Oeste  and Palcaraju Sur .

In July 2012, two American climbers, Ben Horne and Gil Weiss,  died on the way back down, after scaling the south face of Palcaraju W.

References

Mountains of Peru
Mountains of Ancash Region
Six-thousanders of the Andes